Nursing Inquiry is a quarterly peer-reviewed nursing journal. It was established in 1994 with Judy Parker (La Trobe University) as the founding editor-in-chief. Sioban Nelson (University of Toronto) succeeded Parker in 2006. It is published by John Wiley & Sons and the current editor-in-chief is Sally Thorne (University of British Columbia). According to the Journal Citation Reports, the journal has a 2020 impact factor of 2.393, ranking it 27th out of 124 journals in the category "Nursing (Science)" and 26th out of 122 in the category "Nursing (Social Science)".

References

External links

General nursing journals
Publications established in 1994
Quarterly journals
English-language journals
Wiley (publisher) academic journals